Grecia is an underground metro station on the Line 4 of the Santiago Metro, in Santiago, Chile. The station features a steel-framed skylight. The northernmost portion of the tracks and platforms are laterally curved, which is a distinctive feature of this station.

The station was opened on 30 November 2005 as southern terminus of the inaugural section of the line between Tobalaba and Grecia. It was briefly the southern terminus of the northern section of the Line 4 until the stations along of the median of Vespucio Sur were put in service on 2 March 2006 and the line was extended to Vicente Valdés.

References

Santiago Metro stations
Railway stations opened in 2005
Railway stations in highway medians
Santiago Metro Line 4